Otorabad (also Romanized as Otorābād and Otrābād) is a village in Quchan Atiq Rural District, in the Central District of Quchan County, Razavi Khorasan Province, Iran. At the 2006 census, its population was 623, in 179 families.

References 

Populated places in Quchan County